Monmouthshire was a county constituency of the House of Commons of Parliament of England from 1536 until 1707, of the Parliament of Great Britain from 1707 to 1801, and of the Parliament of the United Kingdom from 1801 to 1885. It elected two Members of Parliament (MPs).

In 1885 the Monmouthshire constituency was divided to create North Monmouthshire, South Monmouthshire and West Monmouthshire.

Boundaries 
The Monmouthshire constituency covered the county of Monmouth, except that from 1832 there was a borough constituency, Monmouth Boroughs, within the county.

Members of Parliament

MPs 1542–1885

MPs 1654–1660

MPs 1660–1885

Election results

Elections in the 1830s

Elections in the 1840s
Williams resigned by accepting the office of Steward of the Chiltern Hundreds, causing a by-election.

Somerset was appointed Chancellor of the Duchy of Lancaster, requiring a by-election.

 

Somerset's death caused a by-election.

Elections in the 1850s

Somerset resigned by accepting the office of Steward of the Manor of Hempholme, causing a by-election.

Elections in the 1860s

Elections in the 1870s

Somerset resigned, causing a by-election.

Somerset was appointed Comptroller of the Household, requiring a by-election.

Elections in the 1880s

References 

W R Williams Parliamentary History of the Principality of Wales

History of Monmouthshire
Historic parliamentary constituencies in South Wales
Constituencies of the Parliament of the United Kingdom established in 1536
Politics of Monmouthshire